Frank "Stewy" Stewart (September 8, 1906 – April 30, 2001) was a Major League Baseball pitcher who played in one game for the Chicago White Sox on October 2, . He pitched in 4.0 innings, allowing four earned runs and four base on balls.

External links

1906 births
2001 deaths
Chicago White Sox players
Peoria Tractors players
Major League Baseball pitchers
Baseball players from Minnesota